Aethiopicodynerus scripticeps is a species of wasp in the family Vespidae. It was described by Cameron in 1910.

References

Potter wasps
Insects described in 1910